HMS Southsea Castle was a 32-gun fifth rate built at Deptford Dockyard in 1694/95. She was assigned to the West Indies. She was wrecked along with HMS Bideford on Hispaniola in November 1699.

She was the second vessel to bear the name Southsea Castle since it was used for a 32-gun fifth rate built by Knowles of Redbridge on 1 August 1696 and wrecked on Dove Sand on 15 September 1697.

Construction and specifications
She was ordered on 24 December 1696 to be built at Deptford Dockyard under the guidance of Master Shipwright Fisher Harding. She was launched on 6 November 1697. Her builder's measure tonnage was calculated as 387 tons (burthen).

The gun armament initially was four demi-culverins on the lower deck (LD) with two pair of guns per side. The upper deck (UD) battery would consist of between twenty and twenty-two 6-pounder guns with ten or eleven guns per side. The gun battery would be completed by four 4-pounder guns on the quarterdeck (QD) with two to three guns per side.

Commissioned service 1698-99
She was commissioned in 1697 under the command of Captain Thomas Swanson. In 1699 Captain Thomas Stepney was assigned as her commander for service at Jamaica.

Loss
She was wrecked along with HMS Bideford on Île-à-Vache, off the coast of Hispaniola, on 12 November 1699.

Notes

Citations

References

 Winfield (2009), British Warships in the Age of Sail (1603 – 1714), by Rif Winfield, published by Seaforth Publishing, England © 2009, EPUB 
 Winfield (2007), British Warships in the Age of Sail (1714 – 1792), by Rif Winfield, published by Seaforth Publishing, England © 2007, EPUB 
 Colledge (2020), Ships of the Royal Navy, by J.J. Colledge, revised and updated by Lt Cdr Ben Warlow and Steve Bush, published by Seaforth Publishing, Barnsley, Great Britain, © 2020, EPUB 
 Lavery (1989), The Arming and Fitting of English Ships of War 1600 - 1815, by Brian Lavery, published by US Naval Institute Press © Brian Lavery 1989, Part V Guns, Type of Guns
 Clowes (1898), The Royal Navy, A History from the Earliest Times to the Present (Vol. II). London. England: Sampson Low, Marston & Company, © 1898
 Clowes (1898), The Royal Navy, A History from the Earliest Times to the Present (Vol. III). London. England: Sampson Low, Marston & Company, © 1898

 

1690s ships
Frigates of the Royal Navy
Individual sailing vessels
Ships built in Deptford
Ships of the Royal Navy